Zacarias Kamwenho (born 5 September 1934 in Chimbundo, Huambo, Angola) is an Angolan emeritus Archbishop and peace activist. He had an important role in the peace process that led to the end of the Angolan Civil War in 2002.

Ecclesiastical career
He was ordained a priest in 1961 and afterwards nominated a teacher at Bela Vista Mission, in Nova Lisboa, now Huambo, where he worked for eight years, being nominated vice-rector in 1970. He was afterwards nominated rector of the Major Seminary of Christ the King in Nova Lisboa, accumulating functions with vicar general of the Diocese of Nova Lisboa, since 26 August 1974. He was made coadjutor bishop of the Roman Catholic Archdiocese of Luanda on 23 November 1974. He became titular bishop of the Diocese of Novo Redondo, now Sumbe, on 10 August 1975. He was nominated coadjutor bishop, with right to succession, of the Archbishop of Lubango on 12 November 1995, becoming Archbishop on 15 January 1997 and assuming office on 2 February 1997. He retired after reaching the age of 75 years on 5 September 2009.

Kamwenho chaired the Episcopal Conference of Angola and São Tomé (CEAST) and the Ecumenical Committee for Peace in Angola (COIEPA), which was established in April 2000 and brings together the Catholic CEAST, the Angolan Evangelical Alliance (AEA) and the Council of Christian Churches in Angola (CICA).

In 2001 he acted as mediator in the Angolan Civil War between MPLA and UNITA. For his role in the peace process he was named co-winner of the Sakharov Prize for Freedom of Thought by the European Parliament in 2001.

References

External links 
Sakharov Prize PDF

20th-century Roman Catholic archbishops in Angola
Living people
21st-century Roman Catholic archbishops in Angola
1934 births
People from Huambo
Sakharov Prize laureates
Roman Catholic bishops of Sumbe
Roman Catholic archbishops of Lubango